Couderc is a surname, and may refer to:

 Anne-Marie Couderc (born 1950), French politician and business executive
 Céline Couderc (born 1983), French female freestyle swimmer
 Joseph-Antoine-Charles Couderc (1810–1875), French operatic tenor/baritone
 Pierre Couderc (1896–1966), French screenwriter, actor, acrobat, and film producer
 Raymond Couderc (born 1946), French politician
 Thérèse Couderc (1805–1885), co-founder of the Sisters of the Cenacle

Occitan-language surnames